Brian Collins may refer to:

 Brian Collins (1970s singer) (born 1950), American country music artist
 Brian Collins (2010s singer), American country music artist
 Brian Collins (basketball) (born 1984), American college basketball coach
 Brian Collins (cricketer) (born 1941), former English cricketer
 Brian Collins (designer), American designer and creative director
 Brian Collins (speedway rider) (born 1948), Scottish former motorcycle speedway rider 
 Kid Ink (born 1986), American rapper
 Brian Collins, a reporter in Waco, Texas; famous for creating the line "Boom goes the dynamite".

See also
 Collins (surname)